Mullaghcarn is a mountain in the southwest Sperrins, County Tyrone, Northern Ireland. The peak reaches a height of 542 m (1778 ft), and is the 370th highest in Ireland. Mullaghcarn is in the Fermanagh and Omagh District Council area, on the edge of Gortin Glen Forest Park, and is the most southerly peak in the Sperrins.

Nature
Mullaghcarn is steep, and has a rocky summit. The west of the mountain is home to conifers. "Acid" grassland is the most common on Mullaghcarn, and peat is not especially common, due to the draining of the eastern mountain. Heather is most common on the northern slopes. The red grouse can be found on heathland around Mullaghcarn.

History
Mullaghcarn was home to firing ranges during World War II. These were used by the police and US Army soldiers stationed in the area.

Gallery

References

Mountains and hills of County Tyrone
Marilyns of Northern Ireland